Ein Tamar (lit. Date Palm Spring) is a moshav in the northern Arava valley in Israel. Located south of the Dead Sea, it falls under the jurisdiction of Tamar Regional Council.

History
Ein Tamar was established in August 1982 by 24 families. The biblical village of Tamar mentioned in Ezekiel 47:19 is probably located in the Hatzeva Fortress near Ir Ovot. Ein Tamar and the neighboring village of Neot HaKikar are among the country's most remote places, forty minutes away from the nearest city, Dimona. Most of the residents of Ein Tamar earn their livelihood from  agriculture. Peppers and melons are the main crops.

References

External links
Ein Tamar Center for the Development of the Negev and Galilee

Moshavim
Populated places established in 1982
Populated places in Southern District (Israel)
1982 establishments in Israel
Agricultural Union